Imanol Corral Matellán (born 19 March 1994) is a Spanish footballer who plays for SD Balmaseda FC as a left back.

Club career
Born in Basauri, Biscay, Basque Country, Corral joined Athletic Bilbao's youth setup in 2004. Part of the Juvenil A team which played in the 2012-13 NextGen Series and were runners-up in the 2013 Copa del Rey Juvenil, he  made his debut as a senior with the farm team CD Basconia in Tercera División, in 2013.

On 8 June 2015 Corral was released by the Lions, and subsequently joined Eibar's reserve team CD Vitoria. He made his first team – and La Liga – debut on 14 February of the following year, coming on as a late substitute for Takashi Inui in a 2–0 home win against Levante UD.

On 29 June 2017, Corral joined SD Balmaseda FC in the fourth division.

References

External links

1994 births
Living people
People from Basauri
Spanish footballers
Footballers from the Basque Country (autonomous community)
Association football defenders
La Liga players
Tercera División players
CD Basconia footballers
CD Vitoria footballers
SD Eibar footballers
Sportspeople from Biscay
Athletic Bilbao footballers